James (Jim) Gegan Miller is an American physicist, engineer, and inventor whose primary interests center around biomedical physics. He is currently a professor of physics, Medicine, and Biomedical Engineering, emeritus, at Washington University in St. Louis, where he holds the Albert Gordon Hill Endowed Chair in the Faculty of Arts and Sciences. He is notable for his interdisciplinary contributions to biomedical physics, echocardiography, and ultrasonics.

Biography 

Miller grew up in St. Louis, Missouri, and received his bachelor's degree in physics, summa cum laude, from Saint Louis University in 1964. He went on to receive master's and doctoral degrees from Washington University in St. Louis in 1966 and 1969, respectively. His doctoral advisor was Daniel Isadore Bolef.

Thereafter he was hired as assistant professor of physics and earned tenure 2 years later, in 1970. He is now Albert Gordon Hill Chair of the Faculty of Arts and Sciences and Director of the Laboratory of Ultrasonics.

Teaching 
For about four decades, Miller taught a course titled "Physics of the Heart" at Washington University. He won the college's Faculty Teaching Award in 1989 and the Emerson Teaching Award in 2004. Over the course of his career, he mentored 35 graduate students and numerous undergraduates, including Nobel Laureate in Chemistry William E. Moerner.

Research 
Miller has published more than 165 refereed journal articles and 110 conference proceedings and book chapters. His work has contributed greatly to ultrasonics, myocardial tissue characterization and has been incorporated into echocardiography devices in use throughout the world.

Awards 

 IR-100 award for Ultrasonic Microemboli Monitor, 1974 (now called R&D 100 awards)
 IR-100 Award: Acoustoelectric Receiving Transducer, 1978
 Sigma Xi National Speaker, 1981-1982
 Fellow of the American Institute of Ultrasound in Medicine, 1986
 Fellow of the Acoustical Society of America, 1990
 Fellow of the Institute of Electrical and Electronics Engineers, 1998
 National Institutes of Health MERIT Award, 1998
Silver medal (in Biomedical Ultrasound/Bioresponse to Vibration), Acoustical Society of America, 2004
 Emerson Excellence in Teaching Award, Washington University, 2004
 Achievement Award, IEEE Ultrasonics, Ferroelectrics, and Frequency Control Society, 2006
 Joseph H. Holmes Basic Science Pioneer Award, American Institute of Ultrasound in Medicine, 2014
 Rayleigh Award, IEEE UFFC, 2016

References 

Washington University physicists
Saint Louis University physicists
Scientists from St. Louis
American biomedical engineers
Washington University School of Medicine faculty
Washington University in St. Louis faculty
1942 births
Living people